Pacific Gas and Electric is an album by Pacific Gas & Electric released in 1969.  It reached #91 on the Billboard Top LPs chart. The album was the first PG&E release on Columbia Records, having been signed after their performance at the Miami Pop Festival in May 1968.

One single came from the album, "Bluesbuster", but it did not chart on the Billboard Hot 100.  The song was featured on the 1970 sampler album, Fill Your Head with Rock.

Critical reception 

In a contemporary review for The Village Voice, Robert Christgau regarded Pacific Gas and Electric as "a pleasant surprise" whose "first side rocks like hell and despite some nonsense with drums and '30s jazz arrangements, even the second can be played over and over."

Track listing
 "Bluesbuster" (Charlie Allen) – 2:55
 "Death Row #172" (Charlie Allen, John Hill) – 3:59
 "Miss Lucy" (Charlie Allen) – 2:28
 "My Women" (Charlie Allen, Tom Marshall) – 5:38
 "She's Long and She's Tall" (John Lee Hooker) – 6:20
 "PG&E Suite: The Young Rabbits/Constitutional Strand/Fat Tom/Boy Wonder" (Brent Block, Tom Marshall, Glenn Schwartz) – 16:41
 "Redneck" (Joe South) – 3:32

Personnel
Adapted from Discogs.
John Hill – producer
Mark Friedman – engineer
Charlie Allen – lead singer
Glenn Schwartz – lead guitar
Tom Marshall – rhythm guitar
Brent Block – bass
John Hill – keyboards
Frank Cook – drums
Wilton Felder – tenor saxophone
Wayne Henderson – trombone
A.D. Brisbois – trumpet
Freddy Hill – trumpet

Charts

References

1969 albums
Pacific Gas & Electric (band) albums
Columbia Records albums